This list of Afghan Air Force aircraft covers all aircraft operated by the Afghan Air Force (AAF) and its predecessors, including the Royal Afghan Air Force, Air and Air Defense Force of the Islamic Emirate of Afghanistan, and the air forces of the various militias and warlords.

By name 

 Aero L-29 Delfín :24 received from 1978 and serving up to 1999
 Aero L-39 Albatros:  35 received from 1977, three reported in use in 1999 by Dostum-Gulbuddin Militia, three remaining in Air Force service, current status unknown
 Aeritalia C-27A:  20 of these tactical transports have been ordered by the United States for delivery from Italy by 2012. Delivered, but no longer in service
 Antonov An-2: More than a dozen received from 1957 for a variety of utility transport roles, some may have remained in service with various forces through 2000
 Antonov An-12:  20 received from 1981 for heavy airlift duties, operational until 2001
 Antonov An-14:  12 received from 1985 as utility transports, operational through 1991
 Antonov An-24:  6 received from 1975 as passenger transports, operational through 2001
 Antonov An-26:  More than fifty  received from 1975 as military cargo transports, operational until 2009
 Antonov An-30:  One received in 1985, did not survive the 1990s
 Antonov An-32:  As many as seventy three received from 1987 as military cargo transports suited to Afghanistan's hot and high environment, operational until 2011
 Avro Anson 18:  13 received from 1948, with the last removed in 1972
 Bartel BM-4b:  One obtained in 1928
 Breda Ba.25/28:  Eight obtained from 1937, eliminated by 1945
 Bristol F.2 Fighter:  Three obtained in 1919, served through 1929
 Boeing 727: 3 Entering service as VIP transports
 Cessna T182T: Six used between 2011 and 2016. Used as a basic trainer.
 Cessna 208B: 24 aircraft currently in service 
Cessna AC-208: 10 aircraft currently in service
 de Havilland DH.9A:  Two added in 1924
 de Havilland R-1:  16 obtained from 1924 to 1926
 Embraer A-29 Super Tucano: Advanced fixed wing trainer and COIN Attack aircraft. 26 aircraft in service with AAF.
 HAL Cheetah 3 obtained from 2014, currently operational
 Hawker Hart:  Eight obtained from 1937, soon replaced
 Hawker Hind:  28 obtained from 1938, served as late as 1957 (one flying model currently in Shuttleworth Collection)
 Ilyushin Il-10:  Unconfirmed
 Ilyushin Il-14:  26 received from 1955 on, served through 2001
 Ilyushin Il-18:  5 received from 1968, served through 2001
 Ilyushin Il-28:  50 received as bombers plus 4 more as trainers from 1957, finally retired in 1994, although trainers may have remained through 2001
 IMAM Ro.37:  16 obtained for reconnaissance from 1937, out of service by 1941 (one on static display at Italian Embassy, Kabul)
 Junkers A.20:  One squadron equipped from 1925 through 1929
 Junkers F.13fe:  4 obtained in 1924 and served through 1939
 Junkers G.24ge:  1 obtained in 1928
 Lockheed C-130 Hercules: 4 C-130H models obtained in 2013 as replacements for the C-27A's
 MD 530F: 18 currently operational.
 Mikoyan MiG-15:  4 fighters received in 1951 and remained through 1979
 Mikoyan MiG-15UTI:  38 trainers received from 1957 and served as late as 1998
 Mikoyan MiG-17F:  100 fighters received from 1957
 Mikoyan MiG-21FL:  40 fighters received from 1965 and serving up to 1996
 Mikoyan MiG-21MF:  70 fighters received from 1980 and serving up to 2001
 Mikoyan MiG-21bis:  50 fighters received from 1980 and serving up to 2005
 Mil Mi-1:  12 utility helicopters received from 1957 and retained through 1976
 Mil Mi-2:  About six delivered for use as utility transport helicopters in 1982
 Mil Mi-4:  18 utility helicopters received from 1963 and remaining in service as late as 1997
 Mil Mi-6:  Perhaps served briefly during the Soviet presence
 Mil Mi-8:  30 transport helicopters received from 1971
 Mil Mi-17:  35 transport helicopters delivered from 1987, with 39 currently in Air Force service (including three dedicated to presidential/distinguished visitor airlift)
 Mil Mi-24:  115 assault helicopters delivered from 1979
 Mil Mi-35:  , 6 in Air Force service, to be partially replaced by 20 Embraer A-29 Super Tucano
 Nieuport 24:  Unknown number obtained from 1921
 Pilatus PC-12: Special operations ISR/ light transport/ utility aircraft, operational from 2014
 Potez 25:  One obtained in 1928, destroyed in 1929
 Sopwith 1½ Strutter:  A few obtained from 1921, discarded by 1925
 Sukhoi Su-7:  30 attack and 16 trainer models received from 1972 and serving to 1989
 Sukhoi Su-17:  25 attack aircraft delivered from 1982, serving to 2001
 Sukhoi Su-22:  45 attack aircraft delivered from 1984, serving to 2001
 UH-60A: Four in use for training, with over 150 ordered an unlikely to be delivered in the coming years
 Yakovlev Yak-11:  14 primary trainers obtained from 1958, serving to 1999
 Yakovlev Yak-18:  14 trainers obtained from 1957, serving 2001

By date of service 

 1919 to 1929:  Bristol F.2 Fighter
 1921 to ?:  Nieuport 24
 1921 to 1925:  Sopwith 1½ Strutter

 1924 to ?:  de Havilland DH.9A
 1924 to 1926:  de Havilland R-1
 1924 to 1939:  Junkers F.13fe
 1925 to 1929:  Junkers A.20
 1928 to ?:  Bartel BM 4b
 1928 to ?:  Junkers G.24ge
 1928 to 1929:  Potez 25

 1937 to ?:  Hawker Hart
 1937 to 1945:  Breda Ba.25/28
 1937 to 1941:  IMAM Ro.37 (one on static display at Italian Embassy, Kabul)
 1938 to 1957:  Hawker Hind (one flying model currently in Shuttleworth Collection)
 1948 to 1972:  Avro Anson
 1951 to 1979:  Mikoyan MiG-15 
 1955 to 2001:  Ilyushin Il-14 
 1957 to 2001:  Ilyushin Il-28 
 1957 to 2001:  Yakovlev Yak-18 
 1957 to 1976:  Mil Mi-1 
 1957 to 1998:  Mikoyan MiG-15UTI 
 1957 to 2000:  Antonov An-2 
 1957 to 2001:  Mikoyan MiG-17 
 1958 to 1999:  Yakovlev Yak-11
 1963 to 1997:  Mil Mi-4 

 1965 to 2001:  Mikoyan-Gurevich MiG-21 
 1968 to 2001:  Ilyushin Il-18 
 1971 to present:  Mil Mi-8 
 1972 to 1999:  Sukhoi Su-7 
 1975 to 2001:  Antonov An-24 
 1975 to 2009:  Antonov An-26 
 1977 to present:  Aero L-39 Albatros
 1978 to 1999:  Aero L-29 Delfín
 1979 to ?:  Mil Mi-24 
 1981 to 2001:  Antonov An-12 
 1982 to ?:  Mil Mi-2 
 1982 to 2001:  Sukhoi Su-17 

 1984 to 2001:  Sukhoi Su-22 
 1985 to 1990s:  Antonov An-30
 1985 to 1991:  Antonov An-14 
 1987 to 2011:  Antonov An-32 
 1987 to present:  Mil Mi-17 
 ? to present:  Mil Mi-35
 2009 to 2012: Aeritalia G.222 (Designated as C-27A)
 2011 to 2016: Cessna T182T Skylane
 2011 to present: Cessna 208B
 2011 to present: MD 530F
2013 to present C-130
2013 to present PC-12
2014 to present HAL Cheetah
2016 to present Embraer A-29 Super Tucano

References

Aircraft
Lists of military aircraft
Military equipment of Afghanistan